Akeel Bilgrami (born 28 February 1950) is an Indian philosopher. He has been in the Department of Philosophy at Columbia University since 1985 after spending two years as an assistant professor at the University of Michigan, Ann Arbor.

Bilgrami is a secularist and an atheist who advocates an understanding of the community-oriented dimension of religion. For Bilgrami, spiritual yearnings are not only understandable but also supremely human. He has argued in many essays that in our modern world, "religion is not primarily a matter of belief and doctrine but about the sense of community and shared values it provides in contexts where other forms of solidarity—such as a strong labor movement—are missing." He has been on the Humanities jury for the Infosys Prize from 2012, serving as Jury Chair from 2019.

Selected publications
 Belief and Meaning (Blackwell, 1992)
 Self-Knowledge and Resentment (Harvard University Press, 2006)
 Secularism, Identity, and Enchantment (Harvard University Press, 2014)
 Nature and Value (Columbia University Press, 2019)
 Politics and The Moral Psychology of Identity (Harvard University Press, forthcoming)

References

External links

Member Profile, Committee on Global Thought at Columbia University
Columbia University Faculty Page

1950 births
University of Chicago alumni
Columbia University faculty
University of Michigan staff
University of Mumbai alumni
Living people
People from Bilgram
Indian atheists
Philosophers of mind
Philosophers of language
Moral psychology
20th-century Indian philosophers
21st-century Indian philosophers
University of Michigan faculty